Mega Man Maker (previously known as Mega Maker) is a fan made action-platform game, released in July 2017 for Microsoft Windows. Based on Capcom's Mega Man series, players are able to create and share their own Mega Man levels online such as a traditional stage from the Mega Man series, puzzle levels and automatic levels (which were made popular in Nintendo's Super Mario Maker) and are able to play other people's levels either by searching their level IDs or the level name. The available categories are "newest", "oldest", "worst rated", "best rated", "popular" and "most played" with the number of up votes and downs votes affecting best rated and worst rated respectively. It is commonly referred as a Super Mario Maker alternative by Mega Man fans.

Gameplay 
The stage builder allows users to select from 198 enemies, 107 level objects, 40 bosses, 81 special weapons, 509 backgrounds, 481 tilesets, 4 playable characters, 148 music tracks from the original Mega Man series, and additional items added by the developers. Some of the features include the ability to rate other people's levels, controller support, and level browsing with nine different filters.

The game has two major modes, play and build. The build mode allows players to design levels by placing tiles and enemies, setting the music, establishing the character's moveset, etc. Players can also download levels and edit them to their heart’s content. 

The play mode allows players to upload their built levels and play others levels. Players can rate the levels they play (but not their own levels) with a thumbs up or a thumbs down. Players can also search for levels by name or by a specific ID code. There is also the Wily Challenge, a mode where players can get from 1 life to 100, depending on the options provided, to play through random levels. The Wily Challenge has three lengths -- Short (5 levels), Medium (10 levels), and Long (20 levels) -- five types of level quality, and three difficulties (Easy, Normal, and Hard).

Development 
The game has been in development since September 2016 and was started by the current leader of the game, WreckingPrograms, who served as the project's leader and central programmer, sprites, and designer. Eleven other developers provided content for the game, ranging from music, artwork, sprites, and programming for the game's website, while a team of fifteen playtesters was hired to test the game.

The game is built on top of the Mega Engine, which was also developed by the creator of the game. Besides bug patches, the developers have included more content down the road, including assets from Mega Man 7 onward as well as other additional features, such as the ability for players to place more than one boss in a level. Mega Man Maker and its development team are not affiliated with Capcom and the game is currently only available on PC.

The latest items, tiles, weapons, backgrounds and music for update 1.7 are from all of the game represented so far,  This update also introduced the character Roll as playable and a music changer which was previously not possible in Mega Man Maker.

The recent 1.8 update featured new items, as well as tiles, weapons, backgrounds, and music from 1998's Mega Man & Bass, as well as the five titles for the Game Boy. The weapons hinted at for the update were Ground Man's Spread Drill, Magic Man's Magic Card, Astro Man’s Copy Vision, Cold Man’s Ice Wall, Burner Man’s Wave Burner, and Tengu Man’s Tengu Blade.

References

External links

Official Wiki
Reddit
Discord server

2017 video games
Action video games
Fangames
Freeware games
Platform games
Side-scrolling video games
Video game clones
Video game level editors
Windows games
Windows-only games